Fulton Ferry is a small area adjacent to Dumbo in the New York City borough of Brooklyn. The neighborhood is named for the Fulton Ferry, a prominent ferry line that crossed the East River between Manhattan and Brooklyn, and is also the name of the ferry slip on the Brooklyn side. The neighborhood is part of Brooklyn Community District 2.

The Fulton Ferry District is a national historic district listed on the National Register of Historic Places in 1974. It consists of 15 contributing buildings built between 1830 and 1895.  They are an assortment of commercial and commercial / residential brick buildings ranging from two to four stories in height, with one eight story building.  That building is the Eagle Warehouse, a Romanesque Revival style building built by The Brooklyn Eagle in 1893. The district is bisected overhead by the Brooklyn Bridge. Today the area holds many popular attractions such as Pier One of Brooklyn Bridge Park and Grimaldi's Pizzeria. Bargemusic, a concert venue, is moored there today. Manhattan ferry service returned in 2006 at the next pier to the north.

Ferry service

Fulton Ferry

Though boats and sail ferries called at these locations since the 18th century, the inauguration of Robert Fulton's steam Fulton Ferry Company in 1814 established his name on the ferry service, which revolutionized travel between the then City of New York on Manhattan Island and the Village of Brooklyn and the rest of Long Island. The opening of the New York and Brooklyn Bridge in 1883 assured the decline of this and other ferries on the East River. Fulton Ferry service ended in 1924. The major thoroughfares leading to the Fulton Ferry from both landings were (and are) named Fulton Street, both in Manhattan and in Brooklyn. The BMT Fulton Street Line and BMT Lexington Avenue Line (or "Old Main Line") elevated railways both ended at the Brooklyn side of the ferry, but were later moved with the majority of trips using the Brooklyn Bridge.

East River Ferry

Ferry service to Manhattan returned in 2006, with New York Water Taxi operating seasonal service. In February 2011, New York Waterway was contracted to operate a route calling at six slips in Brooklyn and Queens as well as the Manhattan East Side terminals. Service, begun in June 2011,  operates in both directions with year-round peak service running every 20 minutes. Additional Summer (April-Oct) daily service runs off-peak every 30 minutes. The NY Waterway service became part of NYC Ferry's East River route in May 2017. In addition, Fulton Ferry has been served by NYC Ferry's South Brooklyn route since 2017.

References

Neighborhoods in Brooklyn
Ferries of New York City
Historic districts on the National Register of Historic Places in Brooklyn
Brooklyn Bridge Park
Underground Railroad in New York (state)